The Buru boobook (Ninox hantu), is a species of owl in the family Strigidae. It is found in Indonesia.  Its natural habitat is subtropical or tropical moist lowland forests. It is threatened by habitat loss.  It used to be considered a subspecies of the Moluccan boobook.

References

Birds described in 1863
Ninox
Birds of Indonesia